Abigail Kofi Kim (born July 19, 1998) is a professional soccer player who plays as a forward. Born in Liberia, she has represented the United States internationally up to under-23 level.

Having played college soccer for California Golden Bears, she has since appeared for LA Galaxy OC in United Women's Soccer, Orlando Pride of the National Women's Soccer League and in Italy for Serie A team Fiorentina.

Early life 
Born in Monrovia, Liberia, Kim grew up with an adopted family in Vashon, Washington. Kim attended Seattle Christian High School and helped lead the school's soccer team to the 1A state championship title in 2015, scoring 41 goals in 20 matches and was named MVP by the Washington State Soccer Coaches Association. She played club soccer for Pacific Northwest SC, winning the state championship in 2013 and 2014. Kim was also a track and field athlete for Seattle Christian, helping the team to three consecutive state titles.

California Golden Bears 
Kim was recruited to play college soccer for California Golden Bears. She was a four-year starter between 2016 and 2019, notably earning Pac-12 All-Freshman Team honors in a 2016 season in which she saw action in all 21 of Cal's matches, leading all freshmen with 16 starts. In 2019, Kim was named captain of the team for her senior season. A legal studies major, Kim was also a Pac-12 All-Academic Honorable Mention in 2018.

In the 2019 offseason, Kim joined UWS club LA Galaxy OC, making three appearances as the team won the National Championship.

Club career

Fiorentina 
Kim was selected in the third round (26th overall) of the 2020 NWSL College Draft by Orlando Pride. Having joined up with the team for preseason, all NWSL activities were shut down just three days in to camp due to the developing coronavirus pandemic. With the ongoing disruption of the 2020 NWSL season and having rehabbed from a knee injury sustained while training over summer, Kim elected to sign in Italy with Serie A team Fiorentina in June. With issues surrounding travel and quarantines, Kim's signing wasn't officially completed until October 17. She made her debut on November 1, starting in a 6–1 victory against second division ASD Riozzese in the 2020–21 Coppa Italia group stage. She scored her first goal for the club on December 13 in a 1–1 Serie A draw with Empoli. Three days later she made her UEFA Women's Champions League debut, starting in a Round of 32 second leg away at Slavia Prague. Fiorentina scored a stoppage time winner to progress 3–2 on aggregate.

Orlando Pride 
After a spell in Italy, Kim returned to Orlando Pride for preseason ahead of the 2021 season and signed a two-year contract with an option for an additional year on March 2, 2021. She made her professional NWSL debut for the club on April 10, 2021, as a 78th minute substitute in the team's Challenge Cup opener against Racing Louisville and scored to give Orlando the lead in the 88th minute. The game finished 2–2. On August 24, 2022, Kim was waived. In two seasons she made 21 appearances in all competitions, scoring one goal and two assists.

International career 
Kim has represented the United States at the under-18 and under-20 and under-23 levels.

In January 2018, Kim was part of the under-20 team that finished as runners-up at the 2018 CONCACAF Women's U-20 Championship, losing the final to Mexico in a penalty shoot-out. In August 2018, Kim was also named to the 2018 FIFA U-20 Women's World Cup squad. The team failed to get out of the group behind Spain and Japan as Kim made three substitute appearances.

In April 2019, Kim was called up to the under-23 team to play at the La Manga U23 tournament, starting in two of the three games.

Career statistics

College

Club 
.

Honors

Club
LA Galaxy OC
UWS National Championship: 2019

Fiorentina
Supercoppa Italiana runner-up: 2020

International
CONCACAF Women's U-20 Championship runner-up: 2018

References

External links 
 California Golden Bears profile
 Fiorentina profile
 Orlando Pride profile
 

1998 births
Living people
Liberian emigrants to the United States
People from Vashon, Washington
Soccer players from Washington (state)
American women's soccer players
Women's association football forwards
African-American women's soccer players
California Golden Bears women's soccer players
Orlando Pride draft picks
Fiorentina Women's F.C. players
Orlando Pride players
Serie A (women's football) players
National Women's Soccer League players
Expatriate women's footballers in Italy
United States women's under-20 international soccer players
Sportspeople from Monrovia
21st-century African-American sportspeople
21st-century African-American women
American adoptees
American people of Liberian descent
American sportspeople of Ghanaian descent